Naranjito de Aguirre is a village and district in the canton of Quepos, Puntarenas Province in Costa Rica.

The district has a population of about 4,000 people.

Villages
Administrative center of the district is the town of Naranjito.

Other villages are Bijagual, Buenos Aires, Capital, Concepción, Cotos, Londres, Negro, Pascua, Paso Indios, Paso Real, Sábalo, Santa Juana, Tacorí and Villanueva.

References

Populated places in Puntarenas Province
Districts of Costa Rica